Sanne Salomonsen (born 30 December 1955), is a Danish singer. She has been performing since 1973, and various songs by her band Sneakers were on the charts continuously from 1979 to 1985.  She was also a member of the Anne Linnet Band. Salomonsen is the daughter of ornithologist Finn Salomonsen.

Discography

Solo albums 
1973: Sanne Salomonsen (Spotlight label) (Danish)
1977: Precious Moments (English)
1985: Sanne Salomonsen (Virgin label) (Danish; last 4 English tracks are bonus tracks taken from the English release)
1987: Ingen engel (Denmark release) (Danish; last 4 English tracks are bonus tracks taken from the English release)
1987: No Angel (English)
1989: Sanne (Danish)
1990: Love Is Gonna Call (English)
1991: Where Blue Begins (English)
1994: Language of the Heart (English)
1996: 1996 (Danish)
1996: 1996 (English)
1998: In a New York Minute (English)
2003: Freedom (English)
2005: The Album (English)
2009: Unico (Danish)
2011: Tiden brænder (Danish)
2012: Hjem (Danish)
2014: Hjem 2014 (Danish)
2017: Baby Blue

Other albums
1994: Unplugged 
2001: Evita

Live albums
2005: The Show

Compilation albums
2000: De bedste af de bedste vol. 1 (Denmark release; features two re-recorded Danish songs, Den jeg elsker and Misbrugt og forladt)
2000: De bedste af de bedste vol. 2 (Denmark release)
2000: Sannes bästa Vol. 1 (Sweden release; different cover art, tracks identical to DK release)
2000: Sannes bästa Vol. 2 (Sweden release; different cover art, tracks identical to DK release)
2006: The Hits (Denmark release)

Albums with Anne Linnet Band
1981: Anne Linnet Band
1982: Cha Cha Cha

Albums with Anne Linnet
Linnet-Salomonsen
1984: Berlin '84
1990: Krig og Kærlighed

Albums with Sneakers
1980: Sneakers
1981: Sui-sui
1982: Rou'let
1984: Katbeat

As guest artist
With Dexter Gordon 
More Than You Know (SteepleChase, 1975)

DVDs 
 2005: The Show DVD
 2005: Et Portræt af hele Danmarks rock-mama

References

External links
 Official homepage

1955 births
Living people
Danish women singers
Danish people of Jewish descent
English-language singers from Denmark
Sonet Records artists
Melodifestivalen contestants of 2015
Melodifestivalen contestants of 2005